The following is a list of bands that perform progressive metalcore, a fusion of progressive metal and metalcore.

List of bands 
 The Afterimage
 After the Burial
 Architects
August Burns Red
Between The Buried and Me
 Born of Osiris
 Crystal Lake
 Elitist
 Erra
 Forevermore
 From A Second Story Window
 Glass Cloud
 The Human Abstract
 I, the Breather
 Intervals
Invent Animate
 Jinjer
 LOATHE
 Make Them Suffer
 Misery Signals
 Monuments
Napoleon
 Northlane
 Novelists FR
 Oceans Ate Alaska
 Pathways
 Periphery
 Polaris
 Reflections
 Silent Planet
 Spiritbox
 Tesseract
 Textures
 Trivium
 Volumes
 Wage War

See also 

 List of metalcore bands
 List of progressive metal artists

References 

Metalcore
Progressive metal
Lists of metalcore bands
Progressive metal musical groups